Attorney General Henry may refer to:

Denis Henry (1864–1925), Attorney-General for Ireland
Robert Harlan Henry (born 1953), Attorney General of Oklahoma
William Alexander Henry (1816–1888), Attorney General of Nova Scotia

See also
General Henry (disambiguation)